Kløve Station is a railway station on the Bergen Line.  It is located at Kløve in the western part of the Raundalen valley in Voss municipality, Vestland county, Norway. The station is served by the Bergen Commuter Rail, operated by Vy Tog, with up to five daily departures in each direction. The station was opened in 1931.

External links
 Jernbaneverket's page on Kløve

Railway stations in Voss
Railway stations on Bergensbanen
Railway stations opened in 1931